Auriac is the name or part of the name of several communes in France:

 Auriac, Aude, in the Aude department
 Auriac, Corrèze, in the Corrèze department
 Auriac, Pyrénées-Atlantiques, in the Pyrénées-Atlantiques department
 Auriac, former commune of the Var, now part of Brue-Auriac
 Auriac-du-Périgord, in the Dordogne department
 Auriac-Lagast, in the Aveyron department
 Auriac-l'Église, in the Cantal department
 Auriac-sur-Dropt, in the Lot-et-Garonne department
 Auriac-sur-Vendinelle, in the Haute-Garonne department